Kerem Tunnel (Hebrew: מנהרת כרם, Minheret Kerem) is a tunnel in southwest Jerusalem, Israel. It is currently the only cycling tunnel in Israel.

The tunnel was originally built in the 1990s by Hagihon (Jerusalem's water company) to run a sewage pipe from the city's southwestern neighborhoods to the Sorek stream sewage treatment plant. The tunnel is 2.1 kilometers long and 3 meter wide.

In 2018, surrounding several large cyclosportive events, the tunnel was officially made a part of the Jerusalem Ring Path, a 42-kilometer cycling route, connecting the path between the valley of Rephaim and the valley of Motza. The Tunnel's southern entrance is in the Rephaim Park, below Ein Lavan, and its northern entrance is in the valley of Ein Kerem, about half a kilometer from the Kerem junction. The tunnel was opened for cyclists in September 2022.

References

Cycling in Israel
Transport in Jerusalem
Tunnels in Israel
Cycling tunnels